| unit_cost          = 
| production_date    = 1972–present
| number             = 
| variants           = MAC-11A1MAC-11/9
| spec_label         = 
| weight             = 1.59 kg (3.50 lbs)
| length             = 248 mm (531 mm stock extended) (9.76 in/20.90 in)
| part_length        = 129 mm
| width              = 
| height             = 
| diameter           = 
| crew               = 
| passengers         = 
| cartridge          = .380 ACP (9×17mm)  9×19mm Parabellum
| cartridge_weight   = 
| barrels            = 
| action             = Straight blowback
| rate               = 1200 rounds/min
| velocity           = 980 ft/s
| range              = * 50 meters (.380 ACP)
 70 meters (9×19mm Parabellum)
| max_range          = 
| feed               = 16 or 32-round box magazine
| sights             = Iron sights
}}

The MAC-11 (Military Armament Corporation Model 11) is a machine pistol developed by American firearm designer Gordon Ingram at the Military Armament Corporation (MAC) during the 1970s in Powder Springs, Georgia, United States. The weapon is a sub-compact version of the Model 10 (MAC-10), and is chambered to fire the smaller .380 ACP round.

This weapon is sometimes confused with the Sylvia & Wayne Daniels M-11/9, its successor the Leinad PM-11, or the Vulcan M-11-9, both of which are later variants of the MAC chambered for the 9 mm Parabellum cartridge.  Cobray also made a .380 ACP variant called the M12.

Design

Operation
Like the larger M-10, the M-11 has iron sights with the rear pinhole sight welded to the receiver. These sights are for use with the folding stock, as using them without the stock is nearly useless because of the initial jump of the weapon due to its heavy, open-bolt design. The M-11A1 also has two safety features which are also found on the Model 10A1. The charging handle rotates to 90 degrees to lock the bolt in the forward position thus preventing the weapon from being cocked. The second safety is a slider which is pushed forward to lock the trigger, which in turn pins the bolt to the rear (cocked) position. This prevents the weapon from discharging even when dropped, which is not uncommon with an open-bolt design.

Performance

The rate of fire of the M-11A1 is one of the biggest complaints on the firearm. Listed as 1,200 rpm (rounds per minute), the MAC-11 is capable of emptying the entire 32-round magazine in less than two seconds, which many users view as a drawback. Rate of fire will also vary depending on the weight of bullets used. The gun also has a selector switch that allows it to fire only one round at a time in the semi-automatic mode.

Noting the weapon's poor accuracy, in the 1970s International Association of Police Chiefs weapons researcher David Steele described the MAC series as "fit only for combat in a phone booth."

The M-11 is the least common version in the MAC family of firearms. At the MAC-11's high cyclic rate, extreme trigger discipline is required to discharge short bursts, which are required for combat effectiveness. Without proper training, the natural tendency of the inexperienced shooter is to hold down the trigger, discharging the entire magazine in little more than two seconds, often with poor accuracy due to recoil.

Sound suppressor
A specific suppressor was developed for the MAC-11, which used wipes as baffles, instead of the reflex baffles that Mitchell WerBell III created for the MAC-10. Though wipes are less durable than reflex baffles, they had the advantage of proving quieter for the MAC-11. The suppressor is 224 mm in length and is covered with Nomex-A heat-resistant material.

Manufacturers 
MAC-type submachine guns and semi-automatic pistols were first manufactured by the Military Armament Corporation, and later by RPB Inc., Sylvia/Wayne Daniel Inc., Cobray, Jersey Arms, Leinad, MasterPiece Arms, and Vulcan.

Users

 : In 1972 20 were acquired for police and inteligence services. A further 24 were acquired for the army and air force in 1973.
 : SWD M11/9 formerly used by GRUMEC 
 : 25 acquired by police forces in the 1970s 
 : Cobray M11/9 formerly used by special forces 
  
 :135 acquired for police forces in 1973
  
 :28 acquired for special forces in the 1970s
 
 : Known to be used by the Cuerpo de Investigaciones Científicas Penales y Criminalísticas (Scientific Penal and Criminal Investigations Corps).
 : In August of 1972 the company Yugoexport ordered 500 Ingram MAC-11 machine pistols in .380 ACP, along with 500 holsters, 500 Sionics suppressors w/ holsters and 1500 spare magazines, delivered in early 1973. Used during the Yugoslav civil wars.

Non-state users
  Lebanese Forces

See also
 Uzi

References

Sources
 Stepan, Randal; Nolan Wilson, Gary Reisewitz (1989). Mac-10 Cookbook. Arkansas: Desert Publications.

External links

MAC Submachine Gun Operating Manual
MAC-11 (YouTube video by Hickok45)

Machine pistols
Telescoping bolt submachine guns
.380 ACP submachine guns
Submachine guns of the United States
Simple blowback firearms
Weapons and ammunition introduced in 1972

pt:Ingram MAC